Passages is the sixth album by the British alternative rock band Jesus Jones, released independently in 2018 through PledgeMusic.

Track listing

Personnel
Jesus Jones
Mike Edwards - vocals, guitar
Jerry De Borg - guitar, trumpet
Alan Doughty - bass
Iain Baker - keyboards
Gen Mathews - drums

References 

Jesus Jones albums
2018 albums